Ivan Vitalyevich Petunin (24 May 199530 September 2022), better known as Walkie, was a Russian hip-hop artist and battle rapper. 

Petunin died by suicide following the 2022 Russian mobilization for the Russo-Ukrainian war, saying, in a video posted to Telegram, that he refuses to kill another man. He released an album before jumping from the 11th floor of a high-rise building in his hometown of Krasnodar.

Biography

Early life
Petunin was born on May 24, 1995 in Belorechensk. He became interested in rap at the age of 14 after listening to Eminem and 2Pac.  He began his first steps in his career back in 2012 at the Slovo battle site, where he battled until 2015. He then joined the army.

First popularity
After returning from the army in 2016, he moved to St. Petersburg and began to participate in rap battle at the site #SLOVOSPB.  Vanya first got discussed after a fight with rapper Abbalbisk during a battle at the SLOVO: Moscow site. Later it turned out that the fight was staged.  2017 turned out to be the most productive year in Vanya's career. He released several albums and took part in dozens of battles, including some on Versus.

Health problems
Against the backdrop of great fatigue, Walkie channel subscribers began to notice his strange behavior, after which several more broadcasts were launched, where Ivan spoke incoherent phrases, jumping from topic to topic.  After that, the rapper's wife and mother placed him in a psychiatric hospital for a month and a half, where he was diagnosed with mania and schizophrenia.  After being discharged from the hospital, Ivan was taken home by his wife. He later jumped from the third floor of his flat, breaking his spine. He was then taken to hospital. Because of all these events, his wife left him, which further affected his condition.  Later, Walkie released an album about this period of his life,  Wolves in a Psychiatric Hospital.

Death
On September 30, 2022, in his Telegram channel, Ivan released a suicide video where he said that because of mobilization and the Russian invasion of Ukraine, he had decided to commit suicide by jumping. He was 27.  On the day of his death, Ivan also released an album where he says goodbye to everyone.

Releases

Rap battles
 2012
 Walkie T vs Toshi Tak-To (Loss)
 Walkie T vs Sano MC (Win)
 Walkie T vs Kolya Haight (Win)
 Peter Parker (Walkie T) vs Green Goblin (Dima KEX) (Loss)
 Walkie T vs KRK (Win)

 2013
 Walkie T & .Otrix vs QcheR & Alr1ght (Loss)
 Walkie T vs Hassan (Loss)
 Walkie T vs Hyde (Win)
 Walkie T vs Lam (Win)
 Walkie T vs Ol Z (Win)
 Walkie T vs Vitya Chirkalo (Win)
 Walkie T vs Edya Elate (Loss)
 Walkie T vs Symba SLK (Win)
 Walkie T vs Dima KEX (Win)
 Walkie T vs Cuban

 2014
 Walkie T vs Lonely Old Woman Hip-Hop (Win)
Walkie T vs VoVaNo
 Walkie T vs Misha Boyara (Win)
 Walkie T & WahaBeat vs Despot & Takini (Win)
 Walkie T vs Dom1no (Draw)
 Walkie T vs Lazo (Win)
 Walkie T vs Nongratta (Win)

 2015
 Walkie T vs. Otrix

 2016
 Walkie vs El Loco (Loss)
 Walkie vs edik_kingsta (Win)
 Walkie vs Milky (Loss)
 Walkie vs Abbalbisk (Loss)
 Walkie vs Abbalbisk (Win)

 2017
 Walkie vs DEEP-EX-SENSE (Loss)
 Walkie vs ΨBOY (Win)
Walkie vs R1Fmabes
 Walkie vs Re-Pac (Win)
 Walkie vs Vыktor Kolomoiskii
 Walkie vs Mozee Montana (Victory)
 Walkie vs Bully "Prime" (Walkie) vs Abbalbisk (Loss)
 Walkie vs Dom1no (BPM)
 Walkie vs Shumm (Loss)

 2018
 Walkie vs Prostitute's Son
 Walkie vs Sector (Draw)
 Walkie vs Shumm (Loss)

 2019
 Walkie vs Edichka (Win)
 Walkie vs BionicleWalkie vs Yuki_NWalkie vs Puncher
 Walkie vs Guide CatWalkie vs Crowd (Loss)
 Walkie vs Solovey (Win)
 Walkie vs Plane Dead (Loss)
Walkie vs Gokilla

 2020
 Walkie vs Vroom (BPM, Lost)
 Walkie vs Blizz4rd (Disqualified)
 Walkie vs Kepkin (Win)

 2021
 Walkie vs KnownAim vs XXOS vs Corypheus vs Odinnadcatiy (Win)
 Walkie vs LeTai (Victory)
 Walkie vs Dictator UAV (Win)

 2022
 Walkie vs Mixi
 Walkie vs Fukish with Hustle vs Chill (Loss)
 Walkie vs Smoke[PlanB] (Loss)
 Walkie vs Mixi vs Dictator UAV vs Abbalbisk vs Zhaba Arkadievna (Loss)

References 

1995 births
2022 deaths
People from Krasnodar Krai
Russian rappers
Suicides by jumping in Russia